Harvest Melody is a 1943 American musical film directed by Sam Newfield and written by Allan Gale. The film stars Rosemary Lane, Johnny Downs, Charlotte Wynters, Sheldon Leonard, Luis Alberni, Claire Rochelle, Syd Saylor, Marjorie Manners, Henry Hall, Billy Nelson, Frances Gladwin, Marin Sais and Herbert Heyes. The film was released on November 22, 1943, by Producers Releasing Corporation.

Plot
Tommy and Jane come to the Hollywood Trocadero from their farm and meet a Hollywood press agent.  After Tommy and Jane explain their current hardships to Chuck (the press agent); and Chuck offers his and his client's help in harvesting the crops from farm.

Cast          
Rosemary Lane as Gilda Parker
Johnny Downs as Tommy Nelson
Charlotte Wynters as Nancy
Sheldon Leonard as Chuck
Luis Alberni as Cafe Manager
Claire Rochelle as Daisy
Syd Saylor as Spot Potter
Marjorie Manners as Jane
Henry Hall as Pa Nelson
Billy Nelson as Canvas Back Kirby
Frances Gladwin as Cigarette Girl
Marin Sais as Ma Nelson
Herbert Heyes as Joe Burton 
Eddie Le Baron as Eddie Le Baron
Eddie Bartell as Radio Rogue Member 
Sydney Chatton	as Radio Rogue Member 
Jimmy Hollywood as Radio Rogue Member 
Sunny Fox as Sunny Fox

References

External links
 

1943 films
American musical films
1943 musical films
Producers Releasing Corporation films
Films directed by Sam Newfield
American black-and-white films
1940s English-language films
1940s American films